Michael Biegler (born 5 April 1961) is a German handball coach.

Sporting achievements

State awards
2015  Gold Cross of Merit

References

1961 births
Living people
German handball coaches
Handball coaches of international teams
German expatriate sportspeople in Poland
People from Rheinisch-Bergischer Kreis
Sportspeople from Cologne (region)